Scorțeni is a commune in Bacău County, Western Moldavia, Romania. It is composed of six villages: Bogdănești, Florești, Grigoreni, Scorțeni, Stejaru and Șerpeni.

References

Communes in Bacău County
Localities in Western Moldavia